Chingiz Ayazovich Allazov (born 10 June 1993) is a Belarusian and Azerbaijani kickboxer currently signed with ONE Championship. He is the current ONE Featherweight Kickboxing World Champion and the 2021 ONE Kickboxing Featherweight World Grand Prix Winner.

A professional competitor since 2009, Allazov is the former K-1 Super Welterweight Champion, the former two-weight WAKO-Pro K-1 rules champion, the former Nuit des Champions Super Welterweight champion and a two-time A1 lightweight tournament winner.

As of March 2023, he is ranked as the world's best lightweight and pound for pound kickboxer in the world by both Combat Press and Beyond Kick.

Early life 
Chingiz Allazov was born in the village of Jandar in Gardabani district, situated on the border between Georgia and Azerbaijan. His family moved to Minsk, Belarus in 1994. He holds a business degree.

Kickboxing career

Early career
Chingiz started Thai boxing at the early age of 10 to receive self-defence skills. His first coach was Alexander Kovtik. Already 4 months after starting his training he won a Club Tournament. A year later Chingiz received the title of best at the Republican amateur contest and his first Champion of the Republic of Belarus title. In the next three years he won every tournament in his age category that he participated in. Overall, Chingiz had 207 (204 wins) fights during his amateur career. His first professional experience was in Thailand at the age of 13. At the age of 16 Allazov moved toa  professional team called "Chinuk" under the guidance of Andrei Gridin. His first professional fight as an adult was against Jakub Safaric from Slovakia in the 63 kg category. Chingiz won the fight in fifteen second by knockout. 

Allazov took part in the 2014 A1 lightweight (-70 kg) tournament, which was held on October 23, 2014. He captured the tournament title after overcoming Wallid Haddad by unanimous decision in the semifinals and Abdallah Mabel in the same manner in the finals. On July 31, 2015, Allazov took part in the 2015 A1 lightweight (-70 kg) qualification tournament. He earned his place in the final tournament after knocking out Michael Pignolo in the second round of their semifinal bout and Kevin Renahy in the third round of their tournament final bout. Allazov faced Ludovic Millet in the semifinals of the A1 lightweight tournament, which was held on October 15, 2015. He won the fight by unanimous decision and advanced to the finals, where he beat Eduard Bernadou by unanimous decision as well.

Allatov faced Djimé Coulibaly for the WAKO-Pro World Middleweight (-72.5 kg) K-1 championship. He captured the title with by unanimous decision. Allazov would fight fight in two non-title bouts, before challenging for his next WAKO-Pro title. He first beat Christian Baya by unanimous decision at Thai Boxe Mania 2016 on January 30, 2016, which was followed up with a first-round knockout of Wu Sihan at Oktagon 2016: Turin on April 16, 2016. Allazov then faced Enriko Kehl for vacant WAKO-Pro Super Lightweight (-70 kg) K-1 championship. He won the fight by a fifth-round knockout.

Allazov faced Bruce Codron for the NDC super welterweight (-70 kg) title Nuit Des Champions 2016 on November 19, 2016. He stopped Codron in the fourth round, first staggering him with a head kick, before he finishing him off with a flurry of strikes. Allazov's next two fights likewise took place on the European circuit, as he knocked Karim Allous out in the first round at Thai Boxe Mania 2017 on January 28, 2017 and won a unanimous decision against Mohamed Hendouf at Victory – ACB KB9: Showdown in Paris on March 25, 2017. Allazov made his Wu Lin Feng debut against Saiyok Pumpanmuang on April 1, 2017. He won the fight by dominant decision.

K-1 Super Welterweight champion

Super welterweight Grand Prix
On March 21, 2017, it was revealed that Allazov would be one of the eight participants in the 2017 K-1 WGP Super Welterweight Championship Tournament, which was scheduled to take place on June 18, 2017. He faced the K-1 World MAX 2010 -70kg Japan Tournament runner-up Hiroki Nakajima in the quarterfinals of the one-day tournament. Allazov won the fight by knockout, as he floored Nakajima with a left uppercut midway through the second round. He faced the reigning Krush Super Welterweight (-70 kg) champion Jordann Pikeur in the semifinals. Allazov once again won by stoppage, as he knocked Pikeur out at the 2:17 minute mark of the opening round. He captured the vacant K-1 Super Welterweight Championship after he overcame the longtime K-1 veteran Yasuhiro Kido by unanimous decision in the finals, with all three judges awarding him a 28–25 scorecard.

Title reign
Allazov faced Dzhabar Askerov in the semifinals of the 2017 Wu Lin Feng Yi Long challenge Tournament, which was held on August 5, 2017. Although he was able to win the fight by unanimous decision, Allazov was forced to withdraw from the tournament with an injury. In his eighth and final fight of the year, Allazov made his first NDC super welterweight (-70 kg) title defense against Cedric Manhoef at Nuit Des Champions 2017 on November 25, 2017. He retained the belt by unanimous decision.

Allazov faced Sudsakorn Sor Klinmee at Thai Boxe Mania on January 28, 2018. He won the fight by unanimous decision, which improved his score against the Thai to 2-0. Allazov made his first K-1 title defense against Hinata Watanabe at K-1 World GP 2018: K'FESTA.1 on March 21, 2018. He stopped Watanabe with a left hook early in the second round. Allazov extended his lengthy win streak to 28 fights with a second-round knockout of Claudiu Bădoi at Duel 3 on April 8, 2018. Allazov vacated the K-1 title on February 5, 2019, after signing with Bellator Kickboxing.

Bellator Kickboxing
On June 20, 2018, Bellator Kickboxing announced that Allazov would face the two-time K-1 World MAX tournament winner and top pound for pound kickboxer Giorgio Petrosyan at Bellator Kickboxing 10 on July 14, 2018. Petrosyan won the fight by a dominant unanimous decision, which snapped Allazov's four-year long 28-fight win streak. Two of the judges scored the bout 49–45 for the Petrosyan, while the third judge awarded the Italian fighter an even wider 50–44 scorecard. 

Allazov bounced back from this loss with a unanimous decision victory over Mohamed Hendouf at Nuit Des Champions on November 24, 2018, in what was his second and final NDC title defense. Allazov faced Sudsakorn Sor Klinmee for the third time in his professional career at Bellator Kickboxing 12 on October 12, 2019. He won the fight by a unanimous decision. 

Following the Sudsakorn fight, it was revealed that Allazov suffered an injury to his right hand. He was expected to make his kickboxing return, following a 13 month layoff, against Frederic Berrichon. The government restrictions, in response to the COVID-19 pandemic, prevented Nuit Des Champions from holding the event, so Allazov's fight was postponed until early 2021.

ONE Championship

ONE Featherweight Grand Prix
On January 16, 2021, it was announced that Allazov had signed with ONE Championship. Allazov made his ONE debut against Enriko Kehl at ONE on TNT 1 on April 7, 2021. He lost a close bout via split decision. 

Allazov faced Samy Sana in the quarter finals of the 2021 ONE Kickboxing Featherweight Grand Prix at ONE Championship: First Strike on October 15, 2021. Allazov won the fight by knockout in 39 seconds of the first round via liver punch, becoming the first fighter to knock Sana out.

Allazov was booked to face Marat Grigorian in the semifinals of the ONE Featherweight Kickboxing World Grand Prix at ONE: Only the Brave on January 28, 2022. Grigorian was later replaced by Jo Nattawut after the former tested positive for COVID-19. Allazov won in dominant fashion by first-round knockout. Allazov faced Sitthichai Sitsongpeenong at ONE: X on March 26, 2022, in the tournament finals. He won the fight by unanimous decision.

ONE Featherweight champion
Allazov was expected face Superbon Singha Mawynn for the ONE Featherweight Kickboxing World Championship at ONE on Prime Video 2 on October 1, 2022. Allazov withdrew with an injury on September 21. His fight with Superbon was rescheduled for ONE on Prime Video 5 on December 3, 2022. In turn, Superbon was forced to withdraw due to an illness and the bout was moved to headline at ONE on Prime Video 6 on January 14, 2023. He won the bout via knockout in the second round and earned the title. This win earned him the Performance of the Night award.

Titles and achievements
ONE Championship
ONE Featherweight Kickboxing World Championship (One time; current) 
2021 ONE Kickboxing Featherweight World Grand Prix Champion
Performance of the Night (Two times) 
K-1
K-1 Super Welterweight Championship
One successful title defense
2017 K-1 World GP -70kg World Tournament Champion 
Nuit des Champions
2017 NDC K-1 Rules Super Welterweight Championship (−70 kg)
Two successful title defenses
World Association of Kickboxing Organizations
2016 WAKO Pro World K-1 Rules Super Welterweight Championship (−70 kg)
2015 WAKO Pro World K-1 Rules Middleweight Championship (−72.5 kg)
Kunlun Fight
2015 Kunlun Fight World Max Group H Tournament Winner
A1
2015 A1 World Grand Prix Tournament Champion (−70 kg)
2014 A1 World Grand Prix Tournament Winner (−70 kg)

Kickboxing record 

|-  style="background:#cfc;"
| 2023-01-14 || Win ||align=left| Superbon Singha Mawynn || ONE Fight Night 6 || Bangkok, Thailand || KO (Punches) || 2 || 1:03  
|-
! style=background:white colspan=9 |
|-

|- style="background:#cfc;"
| 2022-03-26|| Win ||align=left| Sitthichai Sitsongpeenong || ONE: X, ONE Featherweight Kickboxing World Grand Prix Final || Kallang, Singapore || Decision (Unanimous) || 3 || 3:00  
|-
! style=background:white colspan=9 |
|-

|- style="background:#cfc;"
| 2022-01-28|| Win ||align=left| Jo Nattawut || ONE: Only the Brave, ONE Featherweight Kickboxing World Grand Prix Semi-finals || Kallang, Singapore || KO (Left hook) || 1 || 1:55  
|-

|- style="background:#cfc;"
| 2021-10-15|| Win ||align=left| Samy Sana || ONE Championship: First Strike, ONE Featherweight Kickboxing World Grand Prix Quarter Final || Kallang, Singapore || KO (Punch to the Body) || 1 || 0:39         
|-
|- style="background:#fbb;"
| 2021-04-07
| Loss
| align="left" | Enriko Kehl
|ONE on TNT
|Kallang, Singapore
| Decision (Split) 
| 3
| 3:00
|- style="background:#cfc;"
| 2019-10-12
| Win
| align="left" | Sudsakorn Sor Klinmee
|Bellator Kickboxing 12
| Rome, Italy
| Decision (Unanimous)
| 3
| 3:00
|- style="background:#cfc;"
| 2018-11-24
| Win
| align="left" | Mohamed Hendouf
| Nuit Des Champions
| France
| Decision (Unanimous)
| 5
| 3:00
|-
! style=background:white colspan=9 |
|- style="background:#fbb;"
| 2018-07-14
| Loss
| align="left" | Giorgio Petrosyan
|Bellator Kickboxing 10
|Milan, Italy
| Decision (Unanimous)
| 5
| 3:00
|-
|- style="background:#cfc;"
| 2018-04-08
| Win
| align="left" | Claudiu Bădoi
| Duel 3
| Paris, France
| KO (Right Hook to the Body)
| 2
| 2:57
|- style="background:#cfc;"
| 2018-03-21
| Win
| align="left" | Hinata Watanabe
| K-1 World GP 2018: K'FESTA.1
| Japan
| KO (Left Hook)
| 2
| 0:23
|-  
! style=background:white colspan=9 |
|- style="background:#cfc;"
| 2018-01-28 
| Win 
| align="left" | Sudsakorn Sor Klinmee
| Thai Boxe Mania
| Turin, Italy 
| Decision (Unanimous) 
| 3 
| 3:00
|- style="background:#cfc;"
| 2017-11-25 
| Win 
| align="left" | Cedric Manhoef
| Nuit Des Champions 2017
| Marseille, France 
| Decision (Unanimous) 
| 5 
| 3:00
|-
! style=background:white colspan=9 |
|- style="background:#cfc;"
| 2017-08-05
| Win
| align="left" | Dzhabar Askerov
| Wu Lin Feng - Yi Long challenge Tournament Tournament Semi Final
| Zhengzhou, China
| Decision (Unanimous)
| 3
| 3:00
|- style="background:#cfc;"
| 2017-06-18
| Win
| align=left| Yasuhiro Kido
| K-1 World GP 2017 Super Welterweight Championship Tournament, Final
| Tokyo, Japan
| Decision (Unanimous)
| 3
| 3:00
|-
! style=background:white colspan=9 |
|- style="background:#cfc;"
| 2017-06-18
| Win
| align=left| Jordann Pikeur
| K-1 World GP 2017 Super Welterweight Championship Tournament, Semi Finals
| Tokyo, Japan
| KO (Right Hook)
| 1
| 2:17
|- style="background:#cfc;"
| 2017-06-18
| Win
| align=left| Hiroki Nakajima
| K-1 World GP 2017 Super Welterweight Championship Tournament, Quarter Finals
| Tokyo, Japan
| KO (Left Uppercut)
| 2
| 1:18
|- style="text-align:center; background:#cfc;"
| 2017-04-01
| Win
| align="left" | Saiyok Pumpanmuang
| Wu Lin Feng - Yi Long challenge Tournament 1/4 finals 1
| Zhengzhou, China
| Decision (Unanimous)
| 3
| 3:00
|- style="background:#cfc;"
| 2017-03-25
| Win
| align="left" | Mohamed Hendouf
| Victory – ACB KB9: Showdown in Paris
| Paris, France
| Decision (Unanimous)
| 3
| 3:00
|- style="background:#cfc;"
| 2017-01-28
| Win
| align="left" | Karim Allous
| Thai Boxe Mania 2017
| Turin, Italy
| KO (Right High Kick)
| 1
| 1:00
|- style="background:#cfc;"
| 2016-11-19
| Win
| align="left" | Bruce Codron
| Nuit Des Champions 2016
| Paris, France
| KO (Left High Kick and Punches)
| 4
| 1:04
|-
! style=background:white colspan=9 |
|- style="background:#cfc;"
| 2016-06-24
| Win
| align="left" | Enriko Kehl
| Monte-Carlo Fighting Masters
| Monte Carlo, Monaco
| KO (Right Hook)
| 5
| 2:57
|-
! style=background:white colspan=9 |   
|- style="background:#cfc;"
| 2016-04-16
| Win
| align="left" | Wu Sihan
| Oktagon 2016: Turin
| Turin, Italy 
| TKO 
| 1 
|
|- style="text-align:center; background:#cfc;"
| 2016-01-30
| Win
| align="left" | Christian Baya
| Thai Boxe Mania 2016
| Turin, Italy
| Decision (Unanimous)
| 3
| 3:00
|- style="background:#cfc;"
| 2015-11-28
| Win
| align="left" | Djimé Coulibaly
| Venum Victory World Series
| Paris, France
| Decision (Unanimous)
| 5
| 3:00
|-
! style=background:white colspan=9 |
|- style="background:#cfc;"
| 2015-10-15
| Win
| align="left" | Eduard Bernadou
| A1 World Grand Prix Tournament Final
| Lyon, France
| Decision (Unanimous)
| 3
| 3:00
|-
! style=background:white colspan=9 | 
|- style="background:#cfc;"
| 2015-10-15
| Win
| align="left" | Ludovic Millet
| A1 World Grand Prix Tournament Semi Finals
| Lyon, France
| Decision (unanimous)
| 3
| 3:00
|- style="background:#cfc;"
| 2015-07-31
| Win
| align="left" | Kevin Renahy
| A1 World Grand Prix Tournament Final 8
| Marseille, France
| KO (Straight punch)
| 3
|
|-
! style=background:white colspan=9 |  
|- style="background:#cfc;"
| 2015-07-31
| Win
| align="left" | Michael Pignolo
| A1 World Grand Prix Tournament Final 16
| Marseille, France
| KO (Head kick)
| 2
| 1:59
|- style="text-align:center; background:#cfc;"
| 2015-05-30
| Win
| align="left" | Ivan Vladimir
| Obracun U Ringu 13
| Split, Croatia
| TKO
| 2
|
|- style="text-align:center; background:#cfc;"
| 2015-03-17
| Win
| align="left" | Juri Kehl
| Kunlun Fight 21 - World MAX 2015 Group H Tournament Final
| Sanya, China
| Decision (Unanimous)
| 3
| 3:00
|-
! style=background:white colspan=9 |
|- style="background:#cfc;"
| 2015-03-17
| Win
| align="left" | Mustapha Haida
| | Kunlun Fight 21 - World MAX 2015 Group H Tournament Semi Finals
| Sanya, China
| Decision (Unanimous)
| 3
| 3:00
|- style="background:#cfc;"
| 2014-12-18
| Win
| align="left" | Jordan Levrat
| Victory 2, K-1 Rules
| Levallois, France
| KO (Head kick)
| 2
| 0:19
|- style="text-align:center; background:#cfc;"
| 2014-10-23
| Win
| align="left" | Abdallah Mabel
| A1 World Grand Prix Tournament Final
| Lyon, France
| Decision (Unanimous) 
| 3
| 3:00
|-
!- style=background:white colspan=9 |
|- style="background:#cfc;"
| 2014-10-23
| Win
| align="left" | Wallid Haddad
| A1 World Grand Prix Tournament Semi Finals
| Lyon, France
| Decision (unanimous)
| 3
| 3:00
|- style="background:#cfc;"
| 2014-09-13
| Win
| align="left" | Romeo Gablaya
| Tatneft Cup 2014
| Kazan, Russia
| TKO
| 2
|
|- style="text-align:center; background:#cfc;"
| 2014-06-15
| Win
| align="left" | Cristian Milea
| MixFighter "New  Horizont"
| Minsk, Belarus
| Decision (Unanimous)
| 3
| 3:00
|- style="background:#fbb;"
| 2014-01-25
| Loss
| align="left" | Sitthichai Sitsongpeenong
| Thai Boxe Mania
| Turin, Italy
| Ext. R. Decision (Unanimous)
| 4
| 3:00
|- style="background:#fbb;"
| 2013-12-14
| Loss
| align="left" | Marat Grigorian
| Victory
| Levallois-Perret, France
| Decision (Unanimous)
| 3
| 3:00
|- style="background:#cfc;"
| 2013-11-08
| Win
| align="left" | Warren Stevelmans
| Legend Fighting Show 2
| Moscow, Russia
| Decision (Unanimous)
| 3
| 3:00
|-  style="background:#c5d2ea;"
| 2013-04-20
| NC
| align="left" | Marat Grigorian
| Glory 7: Milan
| Milan, Italy
| NC (Allazov cut by  illegal elbow)
| 1
|
|- style="text-align:center; background:#cfc;"
| 2013-02-22
| Win
| align="left" | Alim Nabiev
| Knockout Show
| Moscow, Russia
| Decision (Unanimous)
| 3
| 3:00
|- style="background:#cfc;"
| 2012-11-18
| Win
| align="left" | Sergey Kulyaba
| Mustang Fight Show
| Minsk, Belarus
| Decision (Unanimous)
| 3
| 3:00
|- style="background:#cfc;"
| 2012-05-05
| Win
| align="left" | Alessandro Campagna
| La Notte Dei Campioni
| Seregno, Italy
| KO (Punch)
| 1
|
|- style="text-align:center; background:#cfc;"
| 2012-04-12
| Win
| align="left" | Dmitriy Rudenko
| Fight Code
| Minsk, Belarus
| Decision (Unanimous)
| 3
| 3:00
|- style="background:#cfc;"
| 2012-03-24
| Win
| align="left" | Bovy Sor Udomson
| Oktagon 2012
| Milan, Italy
| KO (Knee)
| 1
| 2:59
|- style="text-align:center; background:#cfc;"
| 2012-01-05
| Win
| align="left" | Erkan Varol
| Thai Boxe Mania
| Turin, Italy
| Decision (Unanimous)
| 3
| 3:00
|- style="background:#cfc;"
| 2011-12-19
| Win
| align="left" | Martin Anwar
| Mustang Fight Show
| Minsk, Belarus
| KO
| 
|
|- style="text-align:center; background:#cfc;"
| 2011-10-15
| Win 
| align="left" | Raouf Beliouz
| TK2 World Max 2011: Fight Code Dragon Series 2011 Part 4  Final 8
| Marseille, France
| KO  
| 2
|
|- style="text-align:center; background:#cfc;"
| 2011-08-14
| Win 
| align="left" | Gabor Gorbics
| Fight Code
| Debrecen, Hungary 
| KO  
| 2
|
|- style="text-align:center; background:#cfc;"
| 2011-06-10
| Win 
| align="left" | Guven Akiyev
| Fight Code
| Istanbul, Turkey
| KO  
| 1
|
|- style="text-align:center; background:#cfc;"
| 2011-03-12
| Win 
| align="left" | Federik Pacini
| MixFighter "New  Horizont"
| Milan, Italy 
| KO  
| 1
|
|-
|- style="text-align:center; background:#cfc;"
| 2011-02-05
| Win 
| align="left" | Rudolf Durica
| Ring Of Honor, NBB2
| Nitra, Slovakia 
| Decision (Unanimous)
| 3
| 3:00
|-
|- style="background:#cfc;"
| 2011
| Win 
| align="left" | Egor Zibrov
| Fighting show "Octopus"
| Minsk, Belarus
| KO
| 1
| 
|-
|- style="background:#cfc;"
| 2011
| Win 
| align="left" | Artur Isayan
| Fighting show "Octopus"
| Minsk, Belarus
| Decision
| 5
| 3:00
|-
|- style="text-align:center; background:#fbb;"
| 2010-12-17
| Loss
| align="left" | Konstantin Trishin
| KOK World GP 2010 in Dnipropetrovsk, Semi-Finals
| Dnipropetrovsk, Ukraine
| Decision
| 3
| 3:00
|-
|- style="background:#cfc;"
| 2010-12-17
| Win 
| align="left" | Aleksey Sherban
| KOK World GP 2010 in Dnipropetrovsk, Quarter-Finals
| Dnipropetrovsk, Ukraine
| Decision (Unanimous)
| 3
| 3:00
|-
|- style="background:#cfc;"
| 2010-10-07
| Win 
| align="left" | Maxim Răilean
| Fighting show "Octopus"
| Minsk, Belarus
| KO (Liver shot)
| 2
| 
|-
|- style="background:#cfc;"
| 2010
| Win 
| align="left" | Jakub Safarik
| Collision
| Prague, Czech Republic
| KO 
| 1
| 0:15
|-
| colspan=9 | Legend:    

|- style="background:#cfc;"
| 2011-04-29 || Win ||align=left| Medet Rakhimov || 2011 IFMA European Championships, Tournament Final || Istanbul, Turkey || KO (Left hook) || 1 ||
|-
! style=background:white colspan=9 |
|-
|- style="background:#cfc;"
| 2011-04-27 || Win ||align=left| Zaur Abdulsalamov || 2011 IFMA European Championships, Tournament Final || Istanbul, Turkey || Decision (Unanimous) || 3 || 2:00
|-
|- style="background:#cfc;"
| 2011-04-25 || Win ||align=left| Roman Mailov || 2011 IFMA European Championships, Tournament Quarterfinal || Istanbul, Turkey || Decision (Unanimous) || 3 || 2:00
|-
|- style="background:#fbb;"
| 2010-10 || Loss ||align=left| Maxim Maruga || 2010 Belarus Muaythai Championships, Tournament Final || Minsk, Belarus || Decision (Unanimous) || 3 || 3:00
|-
! style=background:white colspan=9 |
|-
| colspan=9 | Legend:

See also 
List of ONE Championship champions
List of K-1 champions
List of male kickboxers

References

External links
 Official ONE Championship profile

Belarusian male kickboxers
Belarusian Muay Thai practitioners
Belarusian people of Azerbaijani descent 
Sportspeople from Minsk
Living people
1993 births
Kunlun Fight kickboxers
ONE Championship kickboxers
Glory kickboxers